Faver-Dykes State Park is a Florida State Park located 15 miles south of St. Augustine, near the intersection of I-95 and US 1, and bordering Pellicer Creek, a designated state canoe trail. Activities include fishing, picnicking, boating, canoeing, camping and wildlife viewing.

Among the wildlife of the park are white-tailed deer, bobcats, and river otters. There are many birds in the park, including  bald eagles, falcons, and hawks, as well as egrets, wood storks, white ibis, wild turkeys, and herons.

Amenities and hours 
Amenities include a full-facility campground, primitive youth campground, a boat ramp, two 1/2 mile loop nature trails, and two covered pavilions. Florida state parks are open between 8 a.m. and sundown every day of the year (including holidays).

Gallery

External links
 Faver-Dykes State Park at Florida State Parks

State parks of Florida
Parks in St. Johns County, Florida
Protected areas established in 1950
1950 establishments in Florida